Monomorium salomonis is a species of ant. It is a pest of millets.

References

salomonis
Ants